Philip Ashton (born 2 August 1988) is an English cricketer. He played two first-class matches for Cambridge University Cricket Club between 2009 and 2011.

See also
 List of Cambridge University Cricket Club players

References

External links
 

1988 births
Living people
Cricketers from Cambridgeshire
English cricketers
Cambridge University cricketers
Sportspeople from Cambridge